Stewart St. Ledger Faulkner (born 19 February 1969) is a male retired British athlete who competed in the men's long jump. At 1.93 metres tall, he weighed 86 kilograms.

Athletics career
He was born  in Northampton, Northamptonshire, to parents of Jamaican-Cuban descent. Although his career was plagued by severe tarsal tunnel syndrome (a trapped nerve in his take off foot), he achieved relative success early in his track life. After winning a silver medal at the European Junior Championships in Birmingham in 1987, he went on to represent Great Britain at the 1988 Summer Olympics in Seoul, South Korea, where he just missed reaching the final. The following year he established himself as No. 6 in the Track and Field News IAAF Long Jump World Merit rankings. He represented England in the long jump event, at the 1990 Commonwealth Games in Auckland, New Zealand.

Despite the premature end to his international career, Faulkner was described as an exceptional and precocious talent and still holds national records in the junior indoor and under-23 indoor categories.

Faulkner is a life member of Birchfield Harriers.

References

 sports-reference

1969 births
Living people
People from Brixton
English male long jumpers
Olympic athletes of Great Britain
Athletes (track and field) at the 1988 Summer Olympics
Athletes (track and field) at the 1990 Commonwealth Games
English people of Cuban descent
English people of Jamaican descent
Commonwealth Games competitors for England